The Scarlet Kiss is a 1920 British silent sports film directed by Fred Goodwins and starring Maud Cressall, Philip Hewland and Marjorie Hume.

Cast
 Maud Cressall 
 Philip Hewland 
 Marjorie Hume 
 Cyril Raymond

References

Bibliography
 Mitchell, Glenn. The Chaplin Encyclopedia. B.T. Batsford, 1997.

External links

1920 films
British sports drama films
British silent feature films
1920s sports drama films
Films directed by Fred Goodwins
British black-and-white films
1920s English-language films
1920s British films
Silent sports drama films